Naysash Inlet is an inlet on the Central Coast of British Columbia, Canada, branching off the north side of Smith Inlet in the Smith Sound area.

References

Inlets of British Columbia
Central Coast of British Columbia